The 1931 San Diego mayoral election was held on April 7, 1931 to elect the mayor for San Diego. Incumbent mayor Harry C. Clark stood for reelection to a third term. In the primary election, Clark and Walter W. Austin received the most votes and advanced to a runoff election. Austin was then elected mayor with a majority of the votes in the runoff.

Candidates
Walter W. Austin, businessman
Harry C. Clark, Mayor of San Diego
George S. Parker
David L. Rosco
Bryant H. Howard
Samuel Rose
William I. Kinsley
Flemmer Adams

Campaign
Incumbent Mayor Harry C. Clark stood for reelection to a third term. During the campaign, opponents of Clark argued that there had been little progress on $8.6 million voters had approved for water projects in 1924 under Clark's tenure. 

On March 24, 1931, Walter W. Austin came in first in the primary election with 43.5 percent of the votes, followed by Clark in second place with 22.4 percent. Since no candidate received a majority of the vote, Austin and Clark advanced to a runoff election. On April 7, 1931, Austin came in first place in the runoff election with 73 percent of the vote and was elected to the office of the mayor.

Primary Election results

General Election results

References

1931
1931 in California
1931 United States mayoral elections
1931
April 1931 events